Bounphisith Songkhamphou (born 15 May 1953) is a Laotian boxer. He competed in the men's lightweight event at the 1980 Summer Olympics.

References

External links
 

1953 births
Living people
Laotian male boxers
Olympic boxers of Laos
Boxers at the 1980 Summer Olympics
Place of birth missing (living people)
Lightweight boxers